New Beginnings (红白囍事) is a 20-episode Singaporean drama which debuted on 14 April 2010. It stars Jeanette Aw, Elvin Ng, Tay Ping Hui, Jesseca Liu, Zhang Zhenhuan, Tracy Tan, & Joshua Ang.

Cast

Other characters

Plot
The plot revolves around the Li family, who are in the wedding business, and the Cai family, who run a mortuary. The Chinese traditionally believe that the "red" (represents fortune and happiness) and "white" (associated with death) are not to be associated. As fate would have it, the younger generation cross paths and love blossoms.

Awards & nominations
New Beginnings was well received by audiences. It came second for the year 2010, behind With You, in terms of viewership numbers with around 937,000 viewers per episode.
The other dramas nominated for Best Drama Series are Unriddle , Breakout , The Family Court & With You and Best Theme Songs are Breakout, With You ,The Best things in life & The Illusionist.

Star Awards 2011

References

External links
New Beginnings on MediaCorp

Singapore Chinese dramas
2010 Singaporean television series debuts
2010 Singaporean television series endings
Channel 8 (Singapore) original programming